Lok Ma Chau Village or Lok Ma Chau Tsuen is a village in the Lok Ma Chau area of Yuen Long District, Hong Kong.

Administration
Lok Ma Chau Village is a recognized village under the New Territories Small House Policy.

History
The Cheung clan originated from Dongguan in Guangdong province and settled in Lok Ma Chau Village about 500 years ago.

Features
The Mi Tak Study Hall and its ancillary building in Lok Ma Chau Village have been listed as Grade II historic buildings.

See also
 Ha Wan Tsuen, another village in the Lok Ma Chau area

References

External links

 Delineation of area of existing village Lok Ma Chau (San Tin) for election of resident representative (2019 to 2022)
 Antiquities Advisory Board. Pictures of Mi Tak Study Hall, Main Block, Lok Ma Chau
 Antiquities Advisory Board. Historic Building Appraisal. Mi Tak Study Hall, Ancillary Building, Lok Ma Chau Pictures

Villages in Yuen Long District, Hong Kong
Lok Ma Chau